Megachile morawitzi is a species of bee in the family Megachilidae. It was described by Radoszkowski in 1886.

References

Morawitzi
Insects described in 1886